Jamaica Inn is a British drama television series that was first broadcast on BBC One for three consecutive nights from 21 to 23 April 2014. The three-part series, written by Emma Frost, is an adaptation of Daphne du Maurier's 1936 gothic novel Jamaica Inn. It was poorly received, becoming a subject of controversy and making national news over its mumbling cast and other sound problems.

Plot
Jamaica Inn is set in 1821. It tells the story of Mary Yellan (Jessica Brown Findlay) who is uprooted to live with her Aunt Patience (Joanne Whalley) after her mother dies. Mary finds Aunt Patience under the spell of her husband, Joss Merlyn (Sean Harris) after she arrives at Jamaica Inn, a coaching inn he owns in Cornwall. Mary soon realizes that the inn has no guests and is being used as the hub of Joss' criminal activity, misleading ships and plundering their wreckage. Mary becomes attracted to Jem Merlyn (Matthew McNulty), Joss' younger brother who is a petty thief. Mary hopes for help from Francis Davey (Ben Daniels), the parish vicar, and his sister Hannah (Shirley Henderson).

Background and production
The three-part series was commissioned by Ben Stephenson and Danny Cohen, both from the BBC. Filming began in September 2013 in Cornwall, Yorkshire and Cumbria (Kirkby Lonsdale). It was originally decided that the series would be filmed in Northern Ireland. An investment from Screen Yorkshire was provided for the series.

Cast
Jessica Brown Findlay as Mary Yellan
Matthew McNulty as Jem Merlyn
Sean Harris as Joss Merlyn
Joanne Whalley as Patience Merlyn
Shirley Henderson as Hannah Davey
Ben Daniels as Francis Davey
Andrew Scarborough as Magistrate Bassat
Danny Miller as William
Scarlett Archer as Beth
Andy Gillies as Cakey
David Beck as Twin 1
Daniel Beck as Twin 2
Charlie Wade as Flashy Dealer

Episodes

Reception
The transmission of the first episode brought about a major debate on social media sites about the sound quality and inaudible dialogue, culminating in over 2,000 complaints being received by the end of the series.

Terry Ramsey of The Daily Telegraph wrote that "Daphne du Maurier's story is a classic, but this hard-to-watch (and hear) version is unlikely to have had people gripped." David Stephenson of Daily Express agreed, describing it as a "disappointing BBC drama with mumbling dialogue and absent plot." Sean Harris later addressed his reaction to the mumbling controversy in an interview after his BAFTA Award for Best Actor in a Drama Series for Southcliffe.

References

External links
 
 
 

Fiction set in 1821
2010s British drama television series
2014 British television series debuts
2014 British television series endings
BBC television dramas
English-language television shows
Television shows based on British novels
Television series set in the 1820s
Television shows set in Cornwall
BBC television miniseries
Adaptations of works by Daphne du Maurier
2010s British television miniseries